Joseph Timothy Haydn (Lisbon, Portugal, 1788 - London, 17 January 1856), journalist and compiler of dictionaries, was well known as the author of the "Dictionary of Dates", 1841 (19th edition, 1889), and of the "Book of Dignities", 1851 (3rd revised edition, 1894).

Career
The "Book of Dignities" was a modernized form of Robert Beatson's "Political Index", but omits the lists of holders of many important offices. He also edited Samuel Lewis' "Topographical Dictionaries". His name is used in the "Haydn Series" of dictionaries, which are on the same lines as those he compiled. He does not, however, appear to have taken any part in their actual compilation. They are the "Universal Index of Biography", edited by J. B. Payne, 1870; "Bible Dictionary", edited by C. Boutell, 1871 (2nd edition, 1878); "Dictionary of Popular Medicine and Hygiene", edited by Dr. E. Lankester, 1874 (2nd edition, 1878).

For a short time before his death, aged 69 years, on 18 January 1856, Haydn had been in receipt of a small pension of £25 granted by the government. It was continued to his widow.

He was buried in a common grave (no.7040) on the western side of Highgate Cemetery. His is the first name listed on the nearby Haydn family grave where his wife Mary, sons Henry and Thomas Matthew (who purchased the grave), daughter Kate Maria and her husband Sir Frank Green, 1st Baronet are buried.

References

Annual Register, 1856, p. 232
The Times, 19 January 1856
Gentlemen's Magazine, 1856, i. 542
Westminster Review, January 1830, p 91
Frederic Boase. "Haydn, Joseph Timothy" in Modern English Biography. Netherton and Worth. 1892. Volume 1. Page 1879. Google Books
Bailie, J M (ed). "Haydn, Joseph" in Hamlyn Dictionary of Dates and Anniversaries. Second Revised Edition. 1978. Book Club Associates. London. p 108.

Further reading
  (+ via Internet Archive)

1786 births
1856 deaths
Burials at Highgate Cemetery
Lexicographers